The Too Low for Zero Tour was a concert tour by English musician and composer Elton John, in support of his 17th studio album Too Low for Zero. The tour consisted in 24 shows across Australia, New Zealand and Hong Kong.

Tour
The tour was scheduled to promote the Too Low for Zero album, released on 30 May 1983. This tour featured the addition of keyboardist and guitarist Fred Mandel (who had recently worked with Davey Johnstone in Alice Cooper's band) to the traditional line-up of Davey, Dee and Nigel. The tour began at the Addington Showgrounds in Christchurch and covered 22 shows in New Zealand and Australia, ending up with 2 shows in Hong Kong, China, at the Hong Kong Coliseum.
Ticket sales were phenomenal - most of the concerts were sold out, breaking all previous records.

Setlist

Tour dates

Tour band
Elton John: Piano, Lead Vocals
Davey Johnstone: Guitars, Backing Vocals
Dee Murray: Bass guitar, Backing Vocals
Nigel Olsson: Drums, Percussion, Backing Vocals
Fred Mandel: Keyboards, Guitar, Backing Vocals

References

External links

 Information Site with Tour Dates

Elton John concert tours
1984 concert tours